"Grease: The Dream Mix" is a song released in March 1991 to commemorate the video release of Grease. It followed the success of "The Grease Megamix" (1990). The single was credited to Frankie Valli, John Travolta and Olivia Newton-John and is a megamix of the tracks "Grease", "Sandy" and "Hopelessly Devoted to You".
 
The peaked inside the top 50 of the charts of Belgium, the Netherlands and the United Kingdom.

Track listings
7-inch and cassette single
 "Grease: The Dream Mix" (7-inch version) – 3:44
 "We Go Together" - 3:50
 "We Go Together" – 3:50
 
CD single
 "Grease: The Dream Mix" (7-inch version) – 3:44
 "Grease: The Dream Mix " (12-inch version) – 7:35
 "We Go Together" – 3:50
 "Grease: The Dream Mix" (7-inch Original Groove) – 5:10

Charts

References

 

 
John Travolta songs
Olivia Newton-John songs
1991 singles
Music medleys
Songs from Grease (musical)
Songs written by Barry Gibb
Songs written by Robin Gibb
Songs written by Maurice Gibb
Songs written by Jim Jacobs